The Serpentine River is a major perennial river located in the south-west and western regions of Tasmania, Australia.

Course and features
The Serpentine River is almost entirely inundated by the current Lake Pedder. Before its flooding the river rose at the northwestern corner of the original Lake Pedder and drained the eastern slopes of the Frankland and Wilmot ranges. It flows generally north by northwest, joined by one minor tributary. The river is impounded by the Serpentine Dam, one of three dams that create Lake Pedder, and then flows towards the Gordon Splits where it reaches its confluence with the Gordon River.

See also

References

Further reading

Gordon River power development scheme